G Venkateshwar Reddy (born 14 May 1981) is a politician from Indian National Congress from Telangana.  The government appointed him as the Vice-chairman of the National Board of Micro, Small & Medium Enterprises for a term of three years 2013-2016.

Ministry of Micro, Small & Medium Enterprises
The government appointed G Venkateshwar Reddy as the Vice-chairman of the National Board of Micro, Small & Medium Enterprises (NBMSME) for a period of three years (2013-2016)
He helped many  entrepreneurs by granting loans and advances under Prime Minister Employment Generation Programme  which was under his supervision.
He helped nearly 5000 new entrepreneurs throughout the country with the Scheme PMEGP (Prime Minister Employment Generation Programme).  He has conducted awareness programmes at Hyderabad and Bangalore and also all over the country and he has also  conducted EDP Programmes to new entrepreneurs and students in NB-MSME, Hyderabad.

Political career
From the age of intermediate, he took active participation in Congress party programmes and became a key party activist. He was elected as secretary of Indian Youth Congress in his college days. He was also elected as General Secretary Greater Hyderabad Youth Congress Committee. He is the present TPCC general secretary.

Positions held

 Vice Chairman, MSME
 State General Secretary, TPCC
 Secretary youth congress
 General secretary Greater Hyderabad Committee

References

External links
http://www.venkateshwarreddy.com/gallery.html

People from Hyderabad district, India
1981 births
Living people